James Joseph Baio (born March 15, 1962) is an American former actor. He began acting on TV at the age of 13. Baio is best known for playing Billy Tate on Soap. His last role was in the 1996 film The Mirror Has Two Faces.

Career 
Baio first appeared onscreen in 1975 at age 13. He made guest appearances on series such as The Facts of Life, Fantasy Island and The Love Boat, but his best known role was probably as Billy Tate on the comedy series Soap (1977–81).

Baio's other credits include Matlock, Trapper John, M.D., Matt Houston, Too Close for Comfort and Family Feud. Baio, along with Susan Richardson, participated in the Junior Pyramid special of The $20,000 Pyramid in 1979. He also appeared in the comedy movie The Bad News Bears in Breaking Training (1977) as Carmen Ronzonni.

Personal life 
He was born in Brooklyn, New York. He is the cousin of actor Scott Baio and Vampire Weekend band member Chris Baio. Jimmy is the uncle of New York Yankees outfielder Harrison Bader. Like his cousin Scott, he graduated from Xaverian High School in 1980.

Filmography

References

Further reading
  Holmstrom, John. The Moving Picture Boy: An International Encyclopaedia from 1895 to 1995, Norwich, Michael Russell, 1996, p. 336.
  Dye, David Child and Youth Actors: Filmography of Their Entire Careers, 1914-1985. Jefferson, NC: McFarland & Co., 1988, p. 9.

External links 
 
 

1962 births
Living people
American male child actors
American male film actors
American male television actors
Male actors from New York City
People from Brooklyn
20th-century American male actors
People of Sicilian descent